Rachael Pamela Sporn  (born 26 May 1968, in Murrayville) is an Australian former basketball player and three time Olympian. Sporn was Development Executive for the Australian Melanoma Research Foundation but has since left the organisation.

Career 
Born in Murrayville, Victoria, Sporn played for Adelaide Lightning in Australia's Women's National Basketball League where she was twice league MVP and seven times selected in the WNBL All-Star Five. She heads the all-time points scoring and rebound list for the WNBL. The Women's National Basketball Association club Detroit Shock recruited Sporn for the 1998 season. Sporn played 304 games for the national basketball team, the Opals, including three Olympic Games—two silver medals (2000 and 2004) and a bronze (1996)—and three World Championships (1990, 1994 and 1998).

Sporn is a member of the Australian Sports Hall of Fame and the Australian Basketball Hall of Fame. She was awarded the Australian Sports Medal in 2000 and the Centenary Medal in 2001. Rachael Sporn is currently the only Adelaide Lightning player to have her number retired by the team, having begun her stellar career when the club commenced in the 1993 season. Her #14 singlet hangs on the western wall of the Adelaide Arena alongside the Lightning's 1994, 1995, 1996, 1998 and 2008 WNBL championship banners.

Personal 
In 2015, Sporn was awarded the Medal of the Order of Australia. Sporn is married to Maurie Ranger with whom she has two children. She has remained active in promoting the Adelaide Lightning, and in 2015 campaigned to secure vital funding for the team. In May 2015, the club secured a one-year agreement with the Motor Accident Commission as key sponsor.

Her older brother Kieran Sporn (born 28 August 1966) was also a top level athlete who played Australian rules football.

See also 
 List of Australian WNBA players
 WNBL All-Star Five
 WNBL Top Shooter Award

References 

1968 births
Living people
Adelaide Lightning players
Australian expatriate basketball people in the United States
Australian women's basketball players
Basketball players at the 1996 Summer Olympics
Basketball players at the 2000 Summer Olympics
Basketball players at the 2004 Summer Olympics
Basketball players from South Australia
Detroit Shock players
Medalists at the 1996 Summer Olympics
Medalists at the 2000 Summer Olympics
Medalists at the 2004 Summer Olympics
Olympic basketball players of Australia
Olympic bronze medalists for Australia
Olympic medalists in basketball
Olympic silver medalists for Australia
People from Murrayville, Victoria
Recipients of the Medal of the Order of Australia
Forwards (basketball)